Mission Camp is a historic locale, site of a later Butterfield Overland Mail stagecoach station, located about  west of Wellton on the south bank of the Gila River, in Yuma County, Arizona.

In 1862, during the American Civil War, the Union Army garrisoned a post at the stage station with California Volunteers.

After stagecoach travel resumed in the late 1860s Mission Camp became a stagecoach station once again until 1879 when the Southern Pacific Railroad came into Arizona through Yuma, making it obsolete.

References

Mission Camp
Mission Camp
Mission Camp
American frontier
1858 establishments in New Mexico Territory
Stagecoach stops in the United States
Locale (geographic)